Jacques Andre Zakari Lambo (born 14 May 1976 in Argoum Doutchi) is a former Nigerien footballer, who played as a striker.

He played most of his professional career in Poland and Belgium, appearing for ten different clubs.

Football career
Lambo started his professional career in Nigeren club JS du Ténéré; then he played for Burkinabé club Etoile Filante Ouagadougou. He arrived in Kraków at age 18, and soon he became a regular player for Hutnik Kraków. After a brief spell with Spanish RCD Mallorca, he went to Belgium, when he spent most of the subsequent years, playing for Eendracht Aalst, UR Namur, R.F.C. Tournai, KVC Zwevegem Sport, KVK Ieper and Eendracht Wervik. He also played for German side VfR Mannheim and, for the second time, for Hutnik Kraków.

Zakari Lambo represented Niger at senior level, scoring fifteen goals in twenty matches.

Personal life
Lambo is the father of the footballer Zakari Junior Lambo, who also represented the Niger national team.

References

External links
 
 
 
 
 NFT Profile

1976 births
Living people
Nigerien footballers
Association football forwards
RCD Mallorca players
VfR Mannheim players
Hutnik Nowa Huta players
S.C. Eendracht Aalst players
Ekstraklasa players
Belgian Pro League players
Niger international footballers
Nigerien expatriate footballers
Expatriate footballers in Burkina Faso
Expatriate footballers in Poland
Expatriate footballers in Spain
Expatriate footballers in Belgium
Expatriate footballers in Germany
Nigerien expatriate sportspeople in Poland
Nigerien expatriate sportspeople in Belgium
Nigerien expatriate sportspeople in Burkina Faso
Nigerien expatriate sportspeople in Germany
Nigerien expatriate sportspeople in Spain
People from Dosso Region